Staffel may refer to:
 Staffel (unit), in the air forces of German-speaking countries
 Staffel (mountain), a mountain in Bavaria, Germany
 Staffel, a division in the DDR football league
 Staffel (village), a village in the Odenwald, Germany

People with the surname
 Izrael Abraham Staffel (1814–1884), Polish watchmaker, mechanic and inventor
 Megan Staffel (born 1952), American artist
 Rudolf Staffel (1911–2002), American ceramist

See also
 Staffelkapitän, a position (not a rank) in flying units (Staffel) of the German Luftwaffe
 Schutzstaffel, a major paramilitary organization under Adolf Hitler and the Nazi Party (NSDAP)
 Tim Staffell (born 1948), English rock singer and bass guitarist